Sofía Machado Paonessa (born 1 November 1995) is a field hockey player from Chile, who plays as a defender.

Personal life
Sofía Machado cites former Argentine international, Luciana Aymar, as being her sporting hero.

Machado studied Physical Education and Health at Andrés Bello University.

Career

Under–21 
In 2016, Sofía Machado was a member of the Chile U–21 that won bronze at the Pan American Junior Championship in Tacarigua. Later that year, she also represented Chile at the FIH Junior World Cup in Santiago, where the team finished 9th.

Las Diablas 
At the conclusion of her junior career, Machado debuted for Las Diablas in 2017 during a test event in Cape Town.

Since her debut, Machado has been included in national teams for test matches but never major international tournaments. In 2020, she was officially raised into the senior national squad.

References

External links

1995 births
Living people
Chilean female field hockey players
Female field hockey defenders
Sportspeople from Santiago
21st-century Chilean women